The Shoe Company is a Canadian shoe store, originating in Greater Toronto Area in 1992. From its inception, The Shoe Company was operated by conglomerate Town Shoes. The founder of Town Shoes, Leonard Simpson, had predicted a growth opportunity for footwear to be sold in a big box format.

Acquisition
In May 2018, The Shoe Company, along with fellow Town Shoes banners Shoe Warehouse and DSW Canada, were acquired by DSW Inc., now Designer Brands.

They currently operate 76 stores coast to coast, and offer Canada's largest selection of branded family footwear.

External links

Official Website
Stockx Sneakers
Reps Sneakers Site

Footwear retailers
Companies based in Toronto
Retail companies of Canada
Shoe companies of Canada
Retail companies established in 1992
Canadian companies established in 1992
1992 establishments in Ontario